EGYcon is a speculative fiction convention held annually in Cairo, Egypt as a gathering for all Gamers, Mangakas, Otakus, Bookworms, Potterheads, Cosplayers and others.
It started in 2013 with a series of mini meet-ups and in 2014 a whole convention was held as a big meet up.
EGYcon 2014 was supposed to be an Otaku's gathering, that turned out into a cultural convention of different interests and passion, which was strongly displayed in EGYcon 2015 with more people targeted.
EGYcon was featured in multiple news articles throughout its life span of two years, most prestigious one would by either Kenneth James' in the Daily News Egypt or IGN's.

Every year The Japan Foundation participates in the event and they wrote an article on their blog for EGYcon 2015. EGYcon was also featured in ComicsGate, a Middle East comics website.

EGYcon 2014
Held at Al-Sawy Cultural Wheel, Nile bank
Official attendees number was 1,600.
It had no marketing or branding, a complete word of mouth with people inviting others to an individual's Facebook event.
Event included cosplay competition, Standup comedies, Manga corner, Japan Foundation booth, anime gadgets booths, Maid Cafe (canceled)، Manga drawing corner, Ninjutsu school performance and a metal band performing Anime songs.

EGYcon 2015
Held at Thwe GrEEK Campus, downtown Cairo
Official attendees number was 2,300.
EGYcon Facebook page was founded after EGYcon'14 and handled the event marketing and branding, although still very immature, the event was able to "Take Downtown Cairo by Storm" with a reach over 200,000 over Facebook and media coverage.
Event included a cosplay team flying from Tokyo to perform on stage, a Japanese Gourmet booth, anime gadgets booths, Cosplay Competition (cancelled during event), Gamers section, Manga drawing corner, Ninjutsu school performance and a metal band performing Anime songs.

EGYcon 2016
Held at The GrEEK Campus, downtown Cairo.
Official attendees number was 3,200.
Based on the simplest and most basic social media content available from EGYcon 2015, and genuinely generated content, EGYCon 2016 had over 30,000 unique reach in 2016.

EGYcon 2016 had the best cosplays since launch in 2014, with some serious and professional cosplays proving that EGYcon is Egypt's Geekest Convention in Egypt.

The convention also had multiple stores present, selling anime, manga, gaming and comics along with their accessories. There were also the usual stage as every year. And this year there were multiple gaming championships on going at EGYcon as well as a Yu-Gi-Oh! championship. Japan Foundation was present like every year to let the attendees try out free cosplays.

References

Festivals in Egypt
Speculative fiction сonventions